Ornawee Srisahakit (born 20 June 2000) is a Thai taekwondo practitioner. She represented Thailand at the 2018 Asian Games and clinched gold medal in the women's team poomsae event along with fellow taekwondo practitioners Kotchawan Chomchuen and Phenkanya Phaisankiattikun defeating favourites South Korea in the final.

In 2016, she jointly with Kotchawan Chomchuen and Ornawee Srisahakit claimed the Poomsae World Championship title in the women's team category for Thailand, which also historically became the first ever Poomsae World Championship title victory for Thailand.

References 
 
  
2000 births
Living people
Ornawee Srisahakit
Taekwondo practitioners at the 2018 Asian Games
Medalists at the 2018 Asian Games
Ornawee Srisahakit
Asian Games medalists in taekwondo
Ornawee Srisahakit
Ornawee Srisahakit
Ornawee Srisahakit
Competitors at the 2017 Southeast Asian Games
Medalists at the 2019 Summer Universiade
Ornawee Srisahakit
Competitors at the 2021 Southeast Asian Games
Ornawee Srisahakit